Glenavy is a village and civil parish in County Antrim, Northern Ireland, 17 kilometres north west of Lisburn on the banks of the Glenavy River. In the 2011 Census it had a population of 5,697 people. In early documents it was known as Lenavy.

Demography
The population of Glenavy ward on census day (27 March 2011) was 5,697 people. Of these:
26.07% were aged under 16 years;
10.39% were aged 65 and over;
the average age was 34 years;
49.48% of the population were male and 50.52% were female;
59.96% were from a Catholic "community background";
35.39% were from a 'Protestant and Other Christian (including Christian related)' community background; and
39.07% indicated that they had a British national identity, 38.44% had an Irish national identity, and 30.56% had a Northern Irish national identity.
0.86% were from an ethnic group other than white.

Transport
Glenavy railway station was opened on 13 November 1871, but is no longer operational.

Sport
Glenavy is home to an intermediate-standard football team. Crewe United is a member of the Mid-Ulster Football League.
Glenavy is also home to St. Joseph's GAA Club.

Notable residents
 John Ballance, Premier of New Zealand in the late nineteenth century
 Samuel Hill, recipient of the Victoria Cross
 Ivor Jess, disability sports campaigner
Anne Acheson, sculptor and co-inventor of paper-mache casts for broken limbs

See also
List of civil parishes of County Antrim

References

External links
 Glenavy history site

Villages in County Antrim
Civil parishes of County Antrim